Welcome, Arkansas may refer to one of two communities:
   
Welcome, Columbia County, Arkansas
Welcome, Pope County, Arkansas